Genouillé may refer to the following places in France:

 Genouillé, Charente-Maritime, a commune in the Charente-Maritime department
 Genouillé, Vienne, a commune in the Vienne department